Gruszecki (sometimes anglicized as Grushetsky) is the name of a Polish, Ukrainian and Russian noble family.

History 
The name originates from the knight Maciej, Chorąży  of the King of Poland, Jogaila. The king had granted him the village of Gruszka Duża in eastern Poland in 1411. The Gruszecki family name was derived from the village.

Notable members of the family 
 Maciej Gruszecki - Chorąży  of the King of Poland Jogaila.
 Samuel Gruszecki – secretary  of the King of Poland Zygmunt III, ambassador to Spain.
 Bronisław Samuel Gruszecki, sobriquet  Szumilist – Wojski and Łowczy of Chernihiv, built a castle in Holoskovychi.
 Karol Gruszecki, professional basketball player

In Russia 
 Agafya Grushetskaya (1663 – 1681) –  Tsaritsa of Russia, the first spouse of Tsar Feodor III of Russia.
  (born October 17, 1854 – 1911) – major-general, Governor-General of Tambov.